...And Death Said Live is the fourth album by Finnish melodic death metal band Mors Principium Est. It was released on December 5, 2012 in Japan.

Track listing

Credits

Musicians
 Ville Viljanen – vocals
 Teemu Heinola – bass
 Mikko Sipola – drums
 Andy Gillion – lead guitar
 Andhe Chandler – guitar

Guest musicians
 Ryan Knight - guitar solo on "Birth of the Starchild"
 Jona Weinhofen - guitar solo on "What the Future Holds?"

Production
 Thomas 'Plec' Johansson - recording (vocals, guitars, keyboards), mixing, mastering, additional programming
 Teemu Heinola - recording (bass, drums)
 Andy Gillion – programming

References

2012 albums
Mors Principium Est albums
AFM Records albums